The Book of Wisdom, or the Wisdom of Solomon, is a Jewish work written in Greek and most likely composed in Alexandria, Egypt. Generally dated to the mid-first century BCE, the central theme of the work is "wisdom" itself, appearing under two principal aspects. The first aspect is, in its relation to humankind, wisdom is the perfection of knowledge of the righteous as a gift from God showing itself in action. The second aspect is, in direct relation to God, wisdom is with God from all eternity. It is one of the seven sapiential or wisdom books in the Septuagint, the others being Psalms, Proverbs, Ecclesiastes, Song of Songs (Song of Solomon), Job, and Sirach. It is one of the deuterocanonical books, i.e. it is included in the canons of the Catholic Church and the Eastern Orthodox Church, but most Protestants consider it part of the Apocrypha.

Structure, genre and content
The 19 chapters of the work can be grouped into three sections.<ref>Jerusalem Bible (1966), Introduction to the Wisdom of Solomon, p. 1004</ref> Lester Grabbe organises these as follows:
 Book of Eschatology
 exhortation to justice
 speech of the impious, contrasts of the wicked and the just
 exhortation to wisdom
 Book of Wisdom
 Solomon's speech concerning wisdom, wealth, power and prayer
 Book of History
 introduction, followed by diptychs of plagues
 digression on God's power and mercy
 digression on false worship and further plagues
 recapitulation and concluding doxology.

The book is addressed to the rulers of the earth (verse 1:1), urging them to love righteousness and seek wisdom; the wicked think that all is chance and that they should enjoy each day, but they are deluded. In the second section Solomon (not explicitly named, but strongly implied) tells of his search for wisdom.

The Wisdom of Solomon can be linked to several forms of ancient literature, both Jewish and non-Jewish, but it clearly belongs with biblical Wisdom books such as the Book of Job, one of only five such books among ancient Jewish literature. In terms of classical genre it has been identified as an encomium and with the Greek genre of the "exhortatory discourse", by which a teacher attempts to persuade others to a certain course of action.

Canonicity

Origen in the 2nd century refers to uncertainty about the Book of Wisdom. Melito of Sardis (possibly) in the 2nd century CE, Augustine and Pope Innocent I (405 CE) considered Wisdom of Solomon as part of the Old Testament. Athanasius writes that the Book of Wisdom along with three other deuterocanonical books, while not being part of the Canon, "were appointed by the Fathers to be read". Epiphanius of Salamis mentions that the Wisdom of Solomon was of disputed canonicity. According to the monk Rufinus of Aquileia the Book of Wisdom was categorized as "ecclesiastical" rather than "canonical".

The Book of Wisdom was listed as canonical by the Council of Rome (382 CE), the Synod of Hippo (393), the Council of Carthage (397) and the Council of Carthage (419),Council of Carthage (in 419) Canon 24 Quinisext Council (692), the Council of Florence (in 1442) and the Council of Trent (in 1546).

According to John of Damascus in his Exposition of the Orthodox Faith (c. 730 AD) the Book of Wisdom is not in the ark: "There are also the Panaretus, that is the Wisdom of Solomon, and the Wisdom of Jesus, which was published in Hebrew by the father of Sirach, and afterwards translated into Greek by his grandson, Jesus, the Son of Sirach. These are virtuous and noble, but are not counted nor were they placed in the ark."

Composition
The Wisdom of Solomon was written in Greek, in Alexandria (Egypt), in the late 1st century BCE or early 1st century CE. The author's prime literary source was the Septuagint, in particular the Wisdom literature and the Book of Isaiah, and he was familiar with late Jewish works as the Book of Enoch and with Greek philosophical literature. It is uncertain whether the book has a single author or comes from a school of writers, but recent scholarship has favoured regarding it as a unified work. In either case its blend of Greek and Jewish features suggests a learned Hellenistic background, and despite the address to the "rulers of the world" the actual audience was probably members of the author's own community who were tempted to give up their Jewishness in the face of the temptations of Greek culture and the hostile conditions facing Jews in the Greek world.

Themes
The book opens with the opposed pairs righteousness/unrighteousness and death/immortality: those who do not follow righteousness will fall into "senseless reasoning" and will not be open to wisdom; wisdom is not an inherent human quality nor one that can be taught, but comes from outside, and only to those who are prepared through righteousness. The suffering of the righteous will be rewarded with immortality, while the wicked will end miserably. The unrighteous are doomed because they do not know God's purpose, but the righteous will judge the unrighteous in God's presence. Lady Wisdom, first referred to as "she" in Wisdom 6:12, dominates the middle section of the book, in which Solomon speaks. She existed from the Creation, and God is her source and guide. She is to be loved and desired, and kings seek her: Solomon himself preferred wisdom to wealth, health, and all other things. She in turn has always come to the aid of the righteous, from Adam to the Exodus. The final section takes up the theme of the rescue of the righteous, taking the Exodus as its focus: "You (God) have not neglected to help (your people the Jews) at all times and in all places." (Wisdom 19:22).

Influence
19th-century American author Herman Melville marked his copy of the Wisdom of Solomon heavily. Without knowledge of biblical criticism, he managed to note the interplay of Hellenistic Platonism and Jewish philosophy, writing, "this admirable book seems partly Mosaic & partly Platonic in its tone. Who wrote it I know not. Someone to whom both Plato and Moses stood for godfather." The interplay of multiple philosophies is exemplified in many of Melville's works, specifically Moby-Dick and Clarel, wherein religious and philosophical interplay represent the struggle for certainty in the 19th century.

A considerable portion of the Wisdom of Solomon'', starting with Chapter II, was read at a memorial service in Concord, Massachusetts, on December 2, 1859, the day of the execution of the abolitionist John Brown.

See also
 Judgement of Solomon

References

Works cited

 
 
 
 

1st-century BC books
Deuterocanonical books
Jewish texts
Solomon
Texts in Koine Greek
Wisdom literature
Jewish apocrypha
Culture in Alexandria
Poetic Books